NXT TakeOver: Brooklyn 4 was the 21st NXT TakeOver and the fourth and final TakeOver: Brooklyn professional wrestling livestreaming event produced by WWE. It was held exclusively for wrestlers from the promotion's NXT brand division. The event aired exclusively on the WWE Network and took place on August 18, 2018, at the Barclays Center in Brooklyn, New York as part of that year's SummerSlam weekend.

Five matches were contested at the event. In the main event, Tommaso Ciampa defeated Johnny Gargano in a Last Man Standing match to retain the NXT Championship. In other prominent matches, Kairi Sane defeated Shayna Baszler to win the NXT Women's Championship, and Ricochet defeated Adam Cole to win the NXT North American Championship.

Production

Background
TakeOver was a series of professional wrestling shows that began in May 2014, as WWE's then-developmental league NXT held their second WWE Network-exclusive event, billed as TakeOver. In subsequent months, the "TakeOver" moniker became the brand used by WWE for all of their NXT live specials. Brooklyn 4 was scheduled as the 21st NXT TakeOver event and was held on August 18, 2018, as a support show for that year's SummerSlam pay-per-view. It was the fourth in the TakeOver: Brooklyn chronology, a subseries of TakeOvers that were held at the Barclays Center in Brooklyn, New York as a support show for WWE's annual SummerSlam pay-per-view.

Storylines

The card included matches that resulted from scripted storylines, where wrestlers portrayed heroes, villains, or less distinguishable characters in scripted events that built tension and culminated in a wrestling match or series of matches. Results were predetermined by WWE's writers on the NXT brand, while storylines were produced on their weekly television program, NXT.

On the July 18 episode of NXT, Kairi Sane defeated Candice LeRae and Nikki Cross in a triple threat match to become the number one contender for the NXT Women's Championship and would face Shayna Baszler for the title at TakeOver: Brooklyn 4.

On the July 25 episode of NXT, Ricochet confronted Adam Cole after his match with Sean Maluta. Ricochet then challenged Cole to a match at TakeOver: Brooklyn 4 for the North American Championship, but Cole refused. The following week, a match between Cole and Ricochet for the title was scheduled for TakeOver: Brooklyn 4.

On June 26 at the NXT U.K. Championship event, Moustache Mountain (Tyler Bate and Trent Seven) defeated The Undisputed Era's Kyle O'Reilly and Roderick Strong to capture the NXT Tag Team Championship. On the June 27 episode of NXT, The Undisputed Era defeated Moustache Mountain and Ricochet. Two weeks later, a rematch between the two teams for the titles was scheduled, with The Undisputed Era recapturing the titles. On the August 1 episode of NXT, a tag team match between the two teams for the titles was scheduled for TakeOver: Brooklyn 4.

On June 26 at the NXT U.K. Championship, EC3 and Velveteen Dream teamed up and were defeated by Aleister Black and Ricochet after Dream left the ring during the match. On the August 1 episode of NXT, a match between the two was scheduled for TakeOver: Brooklyn 4.

On the July 25 episode of NXT, Tommaso Ciampa defeated Aleister Black to capture the NXT Championship due to interference from Johnny Gargano. The following week, as Black approached the ring to confront Ciampa, Gargano ran past Black and attacked Ciampa. Black then attacked Gargano. The following week, Ciampa attacked Black and Gargano during their scheduled match. A match between the three for the title was scheduled for TakeOver: Brooklyn 4. After the show was over, Black was later found unconscious in the parking lot of Full Sail Live. With Black out of action after a groin injury, the match was changed to a Last Man Standing match between Ciampa and Gargano.

Event

Preliminary matches 
The event opened with The Undisputed Era (Kyle O'Reilly and Roderick Strong) defending the NXT Tag Team Championship against Moustache Mountain (Tyler Bate and Trent Seven). O'Reilly and Strong performed "Total Elimination" on Seven to retain the titles. After the match, The War Raiders (Hanson and Rowe) attacked Strong and O'Reilly, ending the attack by performing "Fallout" on O'Reilly.

Next, EC3 faced The Velveteen Dream. In the end, Dream executed a cartwheel Death Valley driver and a "Purple Rainmaker" on EC3 on the ring apron to win the match.

After that, Adam Cole defended the NXT North American Championship against Ricochet. After an even match between the two, Cole intercepted a springboard moonsault attempt by Cole into a superkick and followed up with an Ushigoroshi for a nearfall. The two then traded blows, with Cole falling onto Ricochet for a nearfall. In the climax, Ricochet attempted a 630° senton on Cole, but Cole rolled out of the ring, only for Ricochet to leap over the top rope to perform a hurricanrana on Cole. Back in the ring, Ricochet performed the 630° senton to win the title.

In the penultimate match, Shayna Baszler defended the NXT Women's Championship against Kairi Sane. Throughout the match, Baszler focused on injuring Sane's leg. Sane was able to perform an Insane Elbow to the back of Baszler and looked for another, but Baszler rolled out of the ring. Sane then performed a diving crossbody on Baszler and followed up with a second Insane Elbow on Baszler for a nearfall. Baszler applied the "Kirifuda Clutch" on Sane, who touched the ropes to break the submission. In the closing moments, Sane performed an Alabama Slam on Baszler and looked for a third Insane Elbow, but Baszler countered and applied the "Kirifuda Clutch". However, Sane countered into a roll-up to win the title.

Main event 
In the main event, Tommaso Ciampa defended the NXT Championship against Johnny Gargano in a Last Man Standing match. Ciampa performed an "Air Raid Crash" on Gargano through an announce table, who stood at a nine count. Ciampa performed three "Project Ciampas" on Gargano, however, Gargano stood up at a nine count. Gargano performed a superkick on Ciampa, who was seated on a chair. Ciampa performed a lifting double underhook facebuster on Gargano onto the steel steps but Gargano stood at a nine count. Gargano performed a slingshot DDT on Ciampa onto the exposed floorboards, but Ciampa stood at a nine count. Ciampa performed a running knee smash using a chair through the barricade on Gargano and buried Gargano under rubble from the timekeeper’s area, only for Gargano to stand up at a nine count once again. Gargano performed a superkick on Ciampa, who fell through two tables on the exposed concrete, however, Ciampa used a crutch to stand at a nine count. On the stage, Gargano threw Ciampa into the LED screen and applied the "Garga-No-Escape". Gargano used handcuffs to bind Ciampa to the stage and began to perform superkicks on Ciampa. In the climax, Gargano performed a running knee smash on Ciampa, but fell from the stage onto some cases of production equipment. Ciampa rolled off the stage at the count of nine, with the handcuffs holding him up on his feet to beat the count. Gargano could not stand up by a ten count, thus Ciampa retained the title. After the match, medical personnel tended to Gargano as Ciampa silently taunted him with the belt.

Aftermath
The August 29 episode of NXT began with Johnny Gargano addressing his loss to NXT Champion Tommaso Ciampa, only to be interrupted by NXT General Manager William Regal, who demanded to know who attacked Aleister Black. Velveteen Dream entered the proceedings, stating that Wednesday night's show was not about Gargano and challenged him to a match for the following week, which was made official. On that subsequent episode, Dream defeated Gargano. Black's attacker was later revealed to be Gargano himself on the October 24 episode of NXT. The following week, a match between Gargano and Black was made official for TakeOver: WarGames.

On the September 5 episode of NXT, after NXT Women's Champion Kairi Sane successfully won her match, she was confronted by Shayna Baszler, who said that she would be coming back for her title. A brawl between the two ensued, with Sane getting the better of it. The following week, Baszler defeated an enhancement talent to send a message to Sane. On the September 26 episode, it was confirmed that Sane would defend the title against Baszler at the first all-women's pay-per-view event, Evolution.

Brooklyn 4 would be the final in the TakeOver: Brooklyn chronology. Although TakeOver: New York the following year was also held at the Barclays Center, it did not continue the Brooklyn chronology, and was instead held in April as a support show for WrestleMania 35. It was also named after the U.S. state instead of the city.

Results

References

External links
 

Brooklyn IV
2018 WWE Network events
2018 in sports in New York City
Events in Brooklyn, New York
Professional wrestling in New York City
August 2018 events in the United States